Moorong, is a small suburb west of Wagga Wagga, New South Wales, Australia. The suburb is named after the pastoral property "Moorong" which is an Aboriginal word for the Wiradjuri Tribe meaning "Bleak" or "Cold" with other meanings "Bark Shelter" and "Camping Ground". Flowerdale Lagoon and Pomingalarna Reserve are located within the suburb.

References

External links 

Suburbs of Wagga Wagga